No. 2, released as Naming Number Two in North America, is a 2006 New Zealand film written and directed by Toa Fraser in his feature film debut. It was released 16 February 2006 in New Zealand and 3 August 2007 in the U.S. It was adapted from New Zealand-Fijian playwright Fraser's 2000 play.

Plot
Nanna Maria, the matriarch of a Fijian extended family living in a suburb of Auckland, New Zealand, feels that the heart and passion has gone out of her clan. One morning, she demands that her grown grandchildren put on a big family feast at which she will name her successor. The grandchildren—Soul, Charlene, Hibiscus, Erasmus, and her favorite, Tyson—reluctantly turn up, Tyson with his new Danish girlfriend, Maria. Family conflicts play out as the difficult day progresses, but in the end the grandchildren—and eventually Nanna's children too—join with cousins and others in a traditional celebration.

Cast

Production
The film was shot in the Auckland, New Zealand suburb of Mount Roskill during the latter part of summer 2005, with interior scenes of Nanna Maria's house taking place on a soundstage at Henderson Valley Studios. Post Production was completed in Wellington, at Park Road Post.

Soon after the arrival of Ruby Dee in New Zealand, the film was put on hold after the news that her husband Ossie Davis had died in the U.S. Dee flew back to attend the funeral. However, before she left New Zealand, she vowed to return and complete the film. The crew were stood down for a 3-week period, and principal photography commenced at the beginning of March 2005.

Awards
 2006 Sundance Film Festival World Cinema Audience Award: Dramatic
 Nomination, 2006 Sundance Film Festival Grand Jury Prize

Soundtrack

References

External links
 Cyan Pictures: Number Two official site
 New Zealand Film Commission profile
 

2006 films
New Zealand drama films
Sundance Film Festival award winners
Films produced by Tim Bevan
2000s English-language films